An antidote is a substance that can counteract a form of poisoning. The term ultimately derives from the Greek term φάρμακον ἀντίδοτον (pharmakon) antidoton, "(medicine) given as a remedy". Antidotes for anticoagulants are sometimes referred to as reversal agents.

The antidotes for some particular toxins are manufactured by injecting the toxin into an animal in small doses and extracting the resulting antibodies from the host animals' blood. This results in an antivenom that can be used to counteract venom produced by certain species of snakes, spiders, and other venomous animals. Some animal venoms, especially those produced by arthropods (such as certain spiders, scorpions, and bees) are only potentially lethal when they provoke allergic reactions and induce anaphylactic shock; as such, there is no "antidote" for these venoms; however anaphylactic shock can be treated (e.g. with epinephrine).

Some other toxins have no known antidote. For example, the poison batrachotoxin – a highly poisonous steroidal alkaloid derived from various poison dart frogs, certain beetles, and birds – has no antidote, and as a result, is often fatal if it enters the human body in sufficient quantities.

Mechanical approaches
Ingested poisons are frequently treated by the oral administration of activated charcoal, which adsorbs the poison and flushes it from the digestive tract, thereby removing a large part of the toxin. 
Poisons which are injected into the body (such as those from bites or stings from venomous animals) are usually treated by the use of a constriction band which limits the flow of lymph and/or blood to the area, thus slowing the circulation of the poison around the body.  This should not be confused with the use of a tourniquet which cuts off blood flow completely – often leading to the loss of the limb.

Techniques to identify antidotes 
In early 2019, a group of researchers in Australia published the finding of a new box jellyfish venom antidote using CRISPR. The technology had been used to functionally inactivate genes in human cell lines and identify the peripheral membrane protein ATP2B1, a calcium transporting ATPase, as one host factor required for box jellyfish venom cytotoxicity.

List of antidotes

See also

 Antitoxin
 Antivenom
 Snakebite
 Universal antidote
 Shapur ibn Sahl

References